Meitan is a county of Guizhou province, China. It is under the administration of the prefecture-level city of Zunyi.

Meitan has a population of 480,000, 420,000 of which work in agriculture. It consists of 9 towns, 6 townships, 118 villages, and 14 communities. The forest coverage rate is 56.5%. Meitan is in the humid subtropical climate zone.

The County of Meitan was established in 1601 (in Ming Dynasty). It was a base for the Red Army during the Long March. Zhejiang University held classes in Meitan for seven years during the Anti-Japanese War. Meitan has been producing tea since 1939 and is known nationally for its tea.

Meitan is rich in agricultural resources and is a typical inland agricultural county. It is famous for its high-quality tea, rice, tobacco, rapeseed, corn, wheat, sericulture, and Chinese herbal medicine. Meitan is known as "The County of Tobacco", "Home of Chinese Liquor", "Tea City", and "The Granary".

Meitan is the largest tea-producing county in Guizhou. Meitan has 20.5 mu (1367 sq kilometers) of tea fields with an annual output of 400 million yuan. Guizhou Meitan Southwest Tea City is the tea market appointed by the Ministry of Agriculture located in the south part of the county. It is the largest Tea distributing center in Northern Guizhou.  Meitan's "Mao Gong" high-quality rice, known as "China's first rice", was awarded the gold medal in the National Quality Rice Exposition for five consecutive years from 2003 to 2007.  Meitan produces 80,000 quintal high-quality tobacco annually and is the major producer for the Shanghai Tobacco Group, which produces "Chunghwa" and "Panda" cigarettes. Mae Wine received the only gold medal ever reward to white liquor in Leipzig International Fair in 1988.

Meitan is also famous for its beautiful landscapes and natural scenery. There are provincial scenic areas "Mejiang Landscape Gallery", the country's largest contiguous tea fields "Western China Tea Sea," "The world's Largest Tea Pot" recorded in Guinness Book of World Records,  the national agricultural tourism demonstration sites "Hetao Ba - Dragon & phoenix Tea Garden", the various karst topography "Hundred-Faced Water" and much more.

Climate

References

 
County-level divisions of Guizhou
Zunyi